The jumping halfbeak (Hemiramphus archipelagicus), is a reef-associated marine species of fish in the family Hemiramphidae. It is a valued commercial fish in tropical countries both dried salted and fresh forms.

Description
The body shows typical halfbeak shape with an elongated lower jaw and cylindrical elongated body. They have no spines on fins, but do have 12-15 rays of their dorsal fins and 10-13 rays on their anal fins. The longest recorded Jumping halfbeak was 34 cm long. There are no vertical bars on sides of the body as other halfbeaks.

Distribution and habitat
The Jumping halfbeak is found tropical waters Indo-Pacific oceans extends from Western India, around Sri Lanka, Thailand, the Philippines, New Guinea to western Polynesia. It is found among the water plants and shallow coastal waters.

See also
List of common commercial fish of Sri Lanka

References

External links
WoRMS
Length weight relationship and condition factor of Hemiramphus archipelagicus Collette and Parin, 1978 (family: Hemiramphidae) from Karachi Coast, Pakistan
Occurrence of heavy copepod infestation on Hemiramphus lutkei and double parasitisms on Hemiramphus far with copepod (Lernaeenicus hemiramphi ) and isopod (Mothocya plagulophora)

archipelagicus
Fish of the Indian Ocean
Fish of the Pacific Ocean
Taxa named by Bruce Baden Collette
Taxa named by Nikolai Vasilyevich Parin
Fish described in 1978